The naval Battle of the Gabbard, also known as the Battle of Gabbard Bank, the Battle of the North Foreland or the Second Battle of Nieuwpoort took place on 2–3 June 1653 (12–13 June 1653 Gregorian calendar). during the First Anglo-Dutch War near the Gabbard shoal off the coast of Suffolk, England between fleets of the Commonwealth of England and the United Provinces.

The battle

The English fleet had 100 ships commanded by Generals at Sea George Monck and Richard Deane and Admirals John Lawson and William Penn. The Dutch had 98 ships under Lieutenant-Admiral Maarten Tromp and Vice-admiral Witte de With, divided in five squadrons. On 2 June 1653 the Dutch attacked but were beaten back because the English employed line-of-battle tactics, making the Dutch pay a high price for attempting to board. The Dutch fleet, consisting of lighter ships, was severely damaged and lost two ships.

On 3 June the English were joined by Admiral Robert Blake, but Tromp decided to try again a direct attack though his ships were practically out of ammunition. A sudden lull however made his ships sitting ducks for the superior English guns. The Dutch were routed, the English chasing them until well in the evening, capturing many Dutch ships. The battle ended with the Dutch losing in total seventeen ships, of which six were sunk and eleven captured. The English lost no ships, but Deane was killed. Tactically this was the worst defeat in Dutch naval history with the exception of the Battle of Lowestoft; strategically the defeat threatened to be disastrous.

The victory meant that the English control over the English Channel, regained by the Battle of Portland in March after it had been lost in the Battle of Dungeness, was now extended to the North Sea. After the battle, the English imposed a blockade on the Dutch coast, capturing many merchant ships and crippling the Dutch economy . The fleets met again on 29–31 July 1653 (8–10 August 1653 Gregorian calendar) at the Battle of Scheveningen.

Ships involved

England

Red Squadron

White Squadron

Blue Squadron

Netherlands
98 ships - of which 6 sunk and 11 captured
 , 54 (flagship of Admiral Tromp)

See also
 of the British Royal Navy was named in honour of the battle.

Notes

References

Gabbard
Gabbard Bank
1653 in England
the Gabbard
17th century in Suffolk
George Monck, 1st Duke of Albemarle